Airdrie Christian Academy, formerly known as Airdrie Christian School or ACS is a private K-12 school located in Airdrie, Alberta. The school was founded in 1987 by Brian Hazeltine and was one of the largest schools in the Calgary area.  In 2019 it renamed as Airdrie Christian Academy. The school has developed a reputation for academic excellence, and has been ranked among the top schools in Alberta. (In 2012 the Fraser Institute ranked the ACS  Elementary School in the top 25% of the province at 157 of 665 schools.)

Building
The school originally occupied the basement of Living Springs Christian Fellowship (then known as Fellowship Bible Chapel), but in 1996 moved into a series of portable buildings behind Faith Community Baptist Church.  In March 2012, they broke ground on what would be their first non-rental location.

References

Airdrie, Alberta
Christian schools in Canada
Private schools in Alberta
High schools in Alberta
Middle schools in Alberta
Elementary schools in Alberta
Educational institutions established in 1987
1987 establishments in Alberta